Newborn is a surname. Notable people with the surname include:

Abe Newborn (c. 1920-1997), American talent agency and theatre producer
Ira Newborn (born 1949), American composer
Jud Newborn (born 1952), American author
Lin Newborn (1974-1998), murder victim
Phineas Newborn, Sr., jazz big band leader in Memphis. His sons:
Phineas Newborn, Jr. (1931-1989), jazz pianist
Calvin Newborn (1933–2018), American jazz guitarist
Newborn Glass - Royersford, PA